Guilded is a VoIP, instant messaging and digital distribution platform designed by Guilded Inc. and owned by Roblox Corporation. Guilded is based in San Francisco. Users communicate with voice calls, video calls, text messaging, media and files in private chats or as part of communities called "guilds". Guilded was founded by Eli Brown, a former Facebook and Xbox employee. Guilded runs on Windows, Linux, macOS, Android and iOS.

Guilded is a Discord competitor that is primarily focused on video gaming communities, such as those focused on competitive gaming and esports. It provides features intended for video gaming clans, such as scheduling tools and integrated calendars. Guilded is developed by Guilded, Inc. which has been an independent product group of the Roblox Corporation since August 16, 2021.

References 

2017 software
Android (operating system) software
Freeware
Instant messaging clients
Instant messaging clients for Linux
Internet properties established in 2017
IOS software
MacOS instant messaging clients
Proprietary cross-platform software
Proprietary freeware for Linux
Voice over IP clients for Linux
Windows instant messaging clients